GKS may refer to:

 GK Software, a German enterprise software developer
 Goskomstat, in the Soviet Union; now the Russian Federal State Statistics Service
 Gottfried Keller-Stiftung, a foundation and Cultural Heritage in Switzerland
 Graphical Kernel System, a computer graphics standard
 Stadion GKS, a multi-purpose stadium in Bełchatów, Poland
 Den gamle kongelige samling (The Old Royal Collection) in the Royal Library, Denmark